The 1974 Richmond WCT, also known as the Fidelity Tournament for sponsorship reasons, was a men's professional tennis tournament. It was held on indoor carpet courts at the Richmond Coliseum in Richmond, Virginia in the United States. It was the ninth edition of the tournament and was held from January 29 through February 3, 1974. The tournament was part of the red group of the 1974 World Championship Tennis circuit. First-seeded Ilie Năstase won the singles title, his second at the event after 1971, and earned $10,000 first-prize money.

Finals

Singles
 Ilie Năstase defeated  Tom Gorman 6–2, 6–3
 It was Năstase's 1st singles title of the year and the 37th of his career.

Doubles
 Nikola Pilić /  Allan Stone defeated  John Alexander /  Phil Dent 6–3, 3–6, 7–6

References

External links
 ITF tournament edition details

Richmond WCT
Richmond WCT
Richmond WCT
Richmond WCT
Richmond WCT
Tennis in Virginia